The Greek Youth Symphony Orchestra (GYSO, ELSON) is the national youth orchestra of Greece, founded in 2017 by conductor Dionysis Grammenos. Since October 2020 the GYSO is  Orchestra in Residence at Megaron the Athens Concert Hall and it is a member of the European Federation of National Youth Orchestras. 

During its three years of existence, more than 100 Greek musicians have been selected, after auditions, to perform with the orchestra, and over 1,500 young people have attended its educational activities. So far, the GYSO has given nine concerts in Greece, featuring world-class soloists, and two composers have been commissioned to write new works for the Orchestra. It has also been invited to perform at the opening concert of the Young Euro Classic Festival at the Berlin Konzerthaus. 

The Greek Youth Symphony Orchestra operates with funding from the John S. Latsis Public Benefit Foundation and is supported by The Hellenic Initiative (THI).

See also 
 List of youth orchestras

References 

Music education organizations
National youth orchestras
European youth orchestras
Musical groups established in 2017
2017 establishments in Greece
Classical music in Greece